Aleksandr Nikolayevich Shitov (Russian: Александр Николаевич Шитов; born 7 November 1950) is a Soviet rower from Russia. He competed at the 1972 Summer Olympics in Munich with the men's eight where they came fourth.

References

1950 births
Living people
Soviet male rowers
Olympic rowers of the Soviet Union
Rowers at the 1972 Summer Olympics
Rowers at the 1976 Summer Olympics
People from Kolomna